The 2016 African U-17 Women's World Cup Qualifying Tournament was the 5th edition of the African U-17 Women's World Cup Qualifying Tournament, the biennial international youth football competition organised by the Confederation of African Football (CAF) to determine which women's under-17 national teams from Africa qualify for the FIFA U-17 Women's World Cup. Players born on or after 1 January 1999 were eligible to compete in the tournament.

The top three teams of the tournament qualified for the 2016 FIFA U-17 Women's World Cup in Jordan as the CAF representatives.

Ghana and Nigeria qualified for the World Cup like in the last four editions, while Cameroon qualified for the first time.

Teams
A total of 15 CAF member national teams entered the qualifying rounds.

Format
Qualification ties were played on a home-and-away two-legged basis. If the aggregate score was tied after the second leg, the away goals rule would be applied, and if still level, the penalty shoot-out would be used to determine the winner (no extra time would be played).

The three winners of the second round qualified for the FIFA U-17 Women's World Cup.

Schedule
The schedule of the qualifying rounds was as follows.

Preliminary round

|}

Note: DR Congo and Gabon withdrew.

Sierra Leone won on walkover.

Djibouti won on walkover.

Namibia won 3–2 on aggregate.

First round

|}

Note: Sierra Leone, Mali and Zambia withdrew.

Morocco won on walkover.

Ghana won on walkover.

3–3 on aggregate. Cameroon won on penalties.

Egypt won 9–0 on aggregate.

Nigeria won 9–0 on aggregate.

South Africa won on walkover.

Second round
Winners qualified for 2016 FIFA U-17 Women's World Cup.

|}

Ghana won 10–0 on aggregate.

Cameroon won 6–1 on aggregate.

Nigeria won 7–0 on aggregate.

Qualified teams for FIFA U-17 Women's World Cup
The following three teams from CAF qualified for the FIFA U-17 Women's World Cup.

1 Bold indicates champion for that year. Italic indicates host for that year.

Goalscorers
8 goals

 Noha Tarek
 Rasheedat Ajibade

4 goals
 Alexandra Takounda

3 goals

 Soline Djoubi
 Mukarama Abdulai
 Cynthia Aku
 Yetunde Fajobi

2 goals

 Melat Demeke
 Barikisu Abdul Rahman
 Sandra Owusu-Ansah
 Kylie van Wyk

1 goal

 Michelle Abueng
 Lesego Radiakanyo
 Claudia Dabda
 Christiana Mpeh Bissong
 Nadin Yasser Ezzat
 Yara Mostafa
 Ymisrach Lakew
 Grace Asantewaa
 Rafia Alhassan
 Philicity Asuako
 Ignacia Haoses
 Patience Dike
 Peace Efih

References

External links
2016 FIFA U-17 Women's World Cup - Qualifiers, CAFonline.com

2016
Women's U-17 World Cup Qualifying Tournament
Women's U-17 World Cup Qualifying Tournament
African U-17 Women's World Cup Qualifying Tournament
African U-17 Women's World Cup Qualifying Tournament
2016 in youth association football